Connolly Drive is an arterial road in the outer northern suburbs of Perth, Western Australia. The road takes its name from the Perth suburb of Connolly, which lies just beyond the road's terminus.

Route description
Connolly Drive starts at Shenton Avenue in Currambine, west of Joondalup's central business district, and ends after a  run at Benenden Avenue in the outer northern suburb of Butler. Connolly Drive runs parallel with fellow arterial road Marmion Avenue to the west and Mitchell Freeway to the east, where, currently, the traffic flow eases past Hester Avenue, which is currently the latter's terminus. The road is a four-lane dual carriageway for its entire length. The speed limit is mostly , though it decreases to  after Lukin Drive as well. The road runs within both the City of Joondalup and Wanneroo local government areas.

City of Joondalup 
Connolly Drive starts at a traffic light controlled T-junction at Shenton Avenue in Currambine, running through the suburb of Currambine for  before encountering Burns Beach Road at a roundabout; midway it encounters Moore Drive at a roundabout. Both Connolly and Moore Drives divide Currambine into quarters. After Macnaughton Crescent, Connolly Drive heads over into the City of Wanneroo, and the uninhabited locality of Tamala Park.

City of Wanneroo 
Now within the City of Wanneroo, Connolly Drive travels through Tamala Park for about  before entering the suburb of Clarkson and encountering Neerabup Road at a roundabout. Hester Avenue is currently the northern terminus of the Mitchell Freeway. From there the road forms the boundary of Merriwa to the west and Ridgewood to the east for  before encountering Lukin Drive at a traffic light controlled intersection.

History
Connolly Drive was first built during the mid-1990s to service the then-new outer northern suburbs of Perth, with three discontinuous sections: two in the City of Joondalup (Currambine and Kinross) with the other in the City of Wanneroo (Merriwa and Ridgewood). The two sections within the City of Joondalup became continuous (running from Shenton Avenue to Selkirk Drive, then to Macnaughton Crescent) by 2001.

In 2007, the missing link through Tamala Park (MacNaughton Crescent to Neerabup Road) as a dual carriageway made the entire road continuous, and the road was extended north of Lukin Drive, to service the growing suburb of Butler. During 2010 and 2011, all single carriageway sections south of Tamala Park were duplicated in response to the growing traffic demand in the area, with several intersections being upgraded during that time as well.

More recently, the section between Neerabup Road and Lukin Drive has been duplicated and widened, in response to the extension of the Mitchell Freeway to Hester Avenue, during 2016. The remaining section of two-lane road, between Lukin Drive and Butler Boulevard, was widened to two lanes in each direction in 2020.

Intersections

The most significant intersections are with Shenton Avenue, Burns Beach Road and Hester Avenue.  Below is a list of all major junctions of the road.

 Shenton Avenue, Connolly–Currambine boundary. Southern terminus at traffic light controlled T-junction.
 Moore Drive, Currambine. Roundabout
  Burns Beach Road, Currambine–Kinross boundary. Roundabout.
 Selkirk Drive, Kinross. Traffic light controlled T-junction.
 Neerabup Road, Clarkson. Roundabout.
 Hester Avenue, Clarkson–Merriwa–Ridgewood tripoint. Roundabout.
 Lukin Drive, Merriwa--–Ridgewood–Butler tripoint. Traffic light controlled intersection.
 Benenden Avenue, Butler. Northern terminus at roundabout; continues north as Exmouth Drive.

Gallery

See also

References

Roads in Perth, Western Australia
Articles containing video clips